Zyzzyx Road, also called Zyzzyx Rd., is a 2006 American thriller film written, produced and directed by John Penney and starring Katherine Heigl, Leo Grillo,  and Tom Sizemore.

The film gained notoriety from its gross ticket sales of only $30 on its opening run, due to its intentionally limited release at a single cinema, making it the lowest-grossing film in U.S. history in terms of box office sales, but was bested by The Worst Movie Ever!, which ended up with just $11 during its run.

Plot synopsis
Grant, a philandering accountant, goes to Las Vegas on a business trip and encounters a seductress, Marissa, and her jealous ex-boyfriend Joey. Grant and Marissa incapacitate Joey, believing they have killed him, and decide to bury him along the eponymous Zyzzyx Road, a rural road off Interstate 15 in California's Mojave Desert. After digging a grave, they return to find Joey missing from the trunk of Grant's car. Grant chases Joey through the desert with a shovel, and when he finds him hidden in an abandoned mine, he tells Joey a secret about Marissa.

Cast
 Leo Grillo as Grant, an accountant who begins an affair with Marissa
 Katherine Heigl as Marissa, Grant's lover and Joey's ex-girlfriend. John Penney gambled on Heigl's rising success in Grey's Anatomy to boost sales. Thora Birch was initially offered the role, but she turned it down.
 Tom Sizemore as Joey, Marissa's jealous ex-boyfriend. Grillo "was drawn to his acting chops, and Sizemore's past actually made him more convincing as a tough-guy villain." Several actors, including Jason Lee, turned down the role before Sizemore was cast.
 Yorlin Madera as Truck Driver Bob
 Nancy Linari (voice) as Brenda

Production
Principal photography was in the summer of 2005 and lasted 18 days, plus an additional two days for pickup scenes. The film was shot entirely on location in the Mojave Desert, in and around local mines. Sizemore and longtime friend Peter Walton, who worked as Sizemore's assistant, were arrested during the film's production for repeatedly failing drug tests while on probation. Sizemore was allowed to resume filming his scenes.

Release and box office gross
From February 25 to March 2, 2006, Zyzzyx Road was shown once a day, at noon, at the Highland Park Village Theater in Dallas, Texas, in one auditorium rented by the producers for $1,000. The limited release was deliberate: Grillo was uninterested in releasing the film domestically until it underwent foreign distribution, but the film needed to fulfill the U.S. release obligation required by the Screen Actors Guild for low-budget films (those with budgets less than $2.5 million that are not for the direct-to-video market).

The strategy had the side effect of making it, at the time, the lowest-grossing film in history; it earned just $30 at the box office, from six patrons paying $5 each for admission. Unofficially, its opening weekend netted $20, with the $10 difference due to Grillo personally refunding two tickets purchased by Sheila Moore, the film's makeup artist, who saw the film with a friend.

The similarly-named film Zzyzx has mistakenly been cited as the lowest-grossing of all time instead, due to the two films' similar titles and release in the same month.

Home media
Zyzzyx Road was released on DVD in 23 countries, including Bulgaria, Indonesia, and Portugal. By the end of 2006, it had earned around $368,000. In the summer of 2012, six years after its original release, GoDigital released the film domestically in digital format because of its better performance internationally. It was released on DVD in North America in September 2010.

References

External links
 
 
 

2006 films
2006 thriller films
American thriller films
Films set in California
Films set in the Las Vegas Valley
Films shot in California
Films shot in the Mojave Desert
2000s English-language films
2000s American films